Mazafaka is a cybercrime forum with many users having moved on from sites such as ShadowCrew.

The site offered services such as customisation of Zeus malware to target a specific system.

References 

Dark web
Crime forums
Tor onion services